The second season of Golden Kamuy is a 2018 Japanese anime series, based on the manga series of the same title, written and illustrated by Satoru Noda. At the conclusion of the first season broadcast, a second season was announced and aired from October 8 to December 24, 2018. The staff and cast returned to reprise their roles.

The opening theme is "Reimei" by Sayuri and My First Story while the ending theme is "Tokeidai no Kane" by Eastern Youth.


Episode list

Notes

References

2018 Japanese television seasons
Golden Kamuy episode lists